Polygondwanaland is the twelfth studio album by Australian psychedelic rock band King Gizzard & the Lizard Wizard. The album was released under an open source licence—the band uploaded the master tapes online for anyone to use. It was released on 17 November 2017. It was the fourth of five albums released by the band in 2017.

Background and conception
The album's title is a portmanteau of the words polygon and Gondwanaland.

Polygondwanaland first appeared as a partial leak on the band's demos for the album. The leak was uploaded to SoundCloud, but was soon taken down. As a result, news of the album was scarce and mostly involved rumors, one of which stated that it would be the last of the five albums released in 2017.

The track "Crumbling Castle," which appeared on the demo, was performed live by the band as early as September 2016, albeit in a much shorter form. However, it lay dormant for many months during an especially prolific period for the band, leading to speculation that the track might have been scrapped. Both the track and the music video were finally released on 18 October 2017, exactly one year after the first performance of the song was uploaded to YouTube. The legitimacy of the demos were all but confirmed at this point, as not only did the track feature the album's name in the lyrics, but it also contained lengthy musical passages equal in duration to the demo.

Release 
Polygondwanaland was officially announced on the band's Facebook page on 14 November 2017. The release date and cover art were publicized by the band, who stated, "This album is FREE. Free as in, free," encouraging fans to make their own copies and bootlegs of the album. The band said that they would not be selling the album in any shape or form, even going so far as to put the master tapes online (including a vinyl master) for free use. The album was uploaded to streaming services such as Spotify and Apple Music on 18 November. Masters and artwork files can be downloaded from the band's website for personal use or for pressing CDs and vinyl.

On the day of the announcement, multiple labels announced they would be producing their own physical copies of the album. Among these were ATO Records, Blood Music, Needlejuice Records, Fuzz Cult Records and Greenway Records. Fans also started crowdfunding campaigns on sites like Facebook and Kickstarter to produce their own versions of the album. After being released by 88 labels worldwide in 188 different variants, they announced an 'official Flightless pressing' of Polygondwanaland.

Versions of the album downloaded from the band's website are sometimes accompanied by a lyrics text file translated into Esperanto and an ASCII Banner of the band's name at the top.

Music

The album has been described as progressive rock and psychedelic rock.

Reception

Polygondwanaland was generally well received by professional music critics upon its initial release. In a 4 out of 5 star review for AllMusic, writer Tim Sendra claimed "Hearing them incorporate all the different sonic flourishes they've employed in the past in pursuit of good songs and not some higher concept means the album may slip past unnoticed, but it will sound great to anyone not scared off by the lack of theatrics. Tracks like the spookily restrained "Searching," the rampaging "The Fourth Colour," the tribal "The Castle in the Air," or the thrumming title track are the work of a band in full command of their process and results."

Pitchfork gave the album a score of 7.2/10 and ranked it 17th in their list of the 20 best rock albums of 2017.

Track listing
Vinyl releases have tracks 1-4 on Side A, and tracks 5-10 on Side B.

Track titles adapted from diymag.com

Writer information from Flightless Records' LP label

Personnel 
Credits for Polygondwanaland adapted from Bandcamp album credits.

King Gizzard & the Lizard Wizard
 Michael Cavanagh – drums , percussion , glass marimba 
 Cook Craig – electric guitar , synthesizers 
 Ambrose Kenny-Smith – harmonica , vocals 
 Stu Mackenzie – vocals , electric guitar , bass guitar , acoustic guitar , synthesizers , flute , glass marimba , mellotron , percussion 
 Eric Moore – management 
 Lucas Skinner – bass guitar , synthesizer 
 Joey Walker – electric guitar , acoustic guitar , bass guitar , synthesizers , vocals , percussion 

Additional musicians
 Leah Senior – spoken word 

Production
 Casey Hartnett – recording 
 Stu Mackenzie – recording , additional recording, production
 Ryan K. Brennan – recording 
 Joey Walker – additional recording
 Sam Joseph – mixing
 Joe Carra – mastering
 Jason Galea – artwork and layout

Charts

References

External link

2017 albums
King Gizzard & the Lizard Wizard albums
Albums free for download by copyright owner
ATO Records albums
Heavenly Recordings albums
Progressive rock albums by Australian artists
Psychedelic rock albums by Australian artists
Math rock albums by Australian artists